This is a list of Bradford (Park Avenue) A.F.C. seasons in English football, from 1907 when the club joined the Southern League to the 2019–20 season. It details the club's achievements in senior league and cup competitions.

Bradford (Park Avenue) were formed in 1863 originally as a rugby union team, in 1895 they joined the breakaway Northern Rugby Football Union and played what would become known as rugby league until 1907 when they turned to football and joined the Southern League. The following season they successfully applied to join the English Football League, becoming the second team from Bradford to join the league after Bradford City five years previously. The club won just one title during its 51 years in the Football League, when it topped Division Three (North) in 1927–28, and also spent three seasons in the top flight of English football. In each of the four seasons from 1966–67 to 1969–70 the club had to apply for re-election and was eventually voted out of the league to be replaced by Cambridge United in 1970. For four seasons they competed in the Northern Premier League before the club folded in 1974.

A new club was reformed in 1977 originally playing Sunday league football before it joined the Central Midlands Football League in 1989–90 and has won two league titles since. In 2004–05 Park Avenue were playing in the Conference North just two divisions below the Football League, but two successive relegations followed. However, the club managed to regain their position in this league and in 2013–14 in English football Park Avenue play in the Conference North.

Seasons

Key

P = Played
W = Games won
D = Games drawn
L = Games lost
F = Goals for
A = Goals against
Pts = Points
Pos = Final position

Div 1 = Football League First Division
Div 2 = Football League Second Division
Div 3 = Football League Third Division
Div 3N = Football League Third Division North
Div 4 = Football League Fourth Division
South 1 = Southern League Division One
Conf N = Conference North
NPL P = Northern Premier League Premier Division
NPL 1 = Northern Premier League Division One
NPL 1N = Northern Premier League Division One North
CML = Central Midlands League Supreme Division
NWC 1 = North West Counties Football League Division One
NWC 2 = North West Counties Football League Division Two
n/a = Not applicable

EP = Extra Preliminary Round
PR = Preliminary Round
1Q = First Qualifying Round
2Q = Second Qualifying Round
3Q = Third Qualifying Round
4Q = Fourth Qualifying Round
5Q = Fifth Qualifying Round
R1 = Round 1
R2 = Round 2
R3 = Round 3
R4 = Round 4
R5 = Round 5
QF = Quarter-finals 
SF = Semi-finals
RU = Runners-up
W = Winners

Division shown in bold when it changes due to promotion or relegation.
Top scorer shown in bold when he set or equalled a club record.

Notes

References

 English National Football Archive
 Football Club History Database
 Football Website

Seasons
Bradford Park Avenue A.F.C.
Bradford Park Avenue AFC seasons